Tarakeshwar Rural Municipality is a Gaunpalika in Nuwakot District in Bagmati Province of central Nepal that was established in 11 March 2018 by merging the former Village Development Committees Khadga Bhanjyang(Ward no. 1 and 3), Gorsyang, Taruka and Dangsing. The headquarters of Tarkeshwor Gaupalika is located in Dangsing.

As it is located on the banks of the Trishuli River and has an on-site observation of the China-Nepal Railway from here, there is a good chance of prosperity if the opportunity is used properly.

It also has a high chance of tourist potential due to its historical, cultural and natural heritages, such as Taruka's Bull fighting, Dhiki-Jato Chulo and other site to make a name for itself in the National and International arena.

The Gaupalika is divided into 6 Wards.The total area of this Gaupalika is 72.62 square kilometer and the total population is 15,719   as per the 2011 Nepal census.

Etymology
The Gaupalika is named as Tarakeshwor because of the Lord Shiva Temple located at Taruka which is known as Tarakeshwar.

Boundaries
East: Bidur Municipality 
West: Nilkantha Municipality(Dhading District)
North: Myagang Rural Municipality
South: Belkotgadhi Municipality

Gallery

References

External links
UN map of the municipalities of Nuwakot District

Populated places in Nuwakot District
Rural municipalities in Nuwakot District
Rural municipalities of Nepal established in 2017